Emmett Andrew McCusker (9 February 1889 – 20 January 1973) was a Liberal party member of the House of Commons of Canada. He was born in Alfred, Ontario and became a physician by career after studying at Regina Collegiate Institute and McGill University where he received his medical degrees (MDCM, FIAM).

He was first elected to Parliament at the Regina City riding in the 1949 general election. After serving one term, he was defeated by Claude Ellis of the Co-operative Commonwealth Federation in the 1953 election. McCusker was also unsuccessful in the 1957 election where he attempted to unseat Ellis.

References

External links
 

1889 births
1973 deaths
Members of the House of Commons of Canada from Saskatchewan
Liberal Party of Canada MPs
Physicians from Ontario